Rick Cramer (born July 19, 1960) is an American professional golfer.

Cramer was born in Independence, Kansas. He played college golf at the University of Colorado where he was a three-time All-American.

Cramer played on the Nationwide Tour in 1990 and from 1996 to 2001. He won once, at the 1996 Nike Wichita Open, and scored a double eagle at the 1996 Nike Shreveport Open. He played on the PGA Tour in 1986 where his best finish was T-37 at the 1986 Buick Open.

Cramer works for the Gateway Tour as the Arizona Series Tournament Director and Head Rules Official.

Professional wins (2)

Nike Tour wins (1)

Other wins (1)
1991 Arizona Open

See also
1985 PGA Tour Qualifying School graduates

References

External links

American male golfers
Colorado Buffaloes men's golfers
PGA Tour golfers
Golfers from Kansas
People from Independence, Kansas
1960 births
Living people